5F-CUMYL-PEGACLONE (5F-SGT-151, SGT-269) is a gamma-carboline based synthetic cannabinoid that has been sold as a designer drug, first being identified in Germany in 2017. It acts as a potent full agonist of the CB1 receptor.  It appears to be more toxic than related compounds such as CUMYL-PEGACLONE, and has been linked to numerous serious adverse reactions, some fatal.

See also 
 5F-CUMYL-PINACA
 CUMYL-5F-P7AICA

References 

Cannabinoids
Designer drugs
Gamma-Carbolines